Carlos Linarez (born 5 September 1991) is a Venezuelan track cyclist.  At the 2012 Summer Olympics, he competed in the men's omnium.

Major results

2010
Central American and Caribbean Games
3rd Omnium

References

External links

Venezuelan male cyclists
Living people
Olympic cyclists of Venezuela
Cyclists at the 2012 Summer Olympics
Venezuelan track cyclists
Sportspeople from Barquisimeto
1991 births
Central American and Caribbean Games bronze medalists for Venezuela
Central American and Caribbean Games medalists in cycling
Competitors at the 2010 Central American and Caribbean Games
21st-century Venezuelan people
Competitors at the 2018 Central American and Caribbean Games